The 1926 Dayton Triangles season was their seventh in the league. The team improved on their previous output of 0–7, winning one game. They tied for sixteenth in the league.

Schedule

Standings

References

Dayton Triangles seasons
Dayton Triangles
Dayton Tri